Sir Carl Wilhelm Siemens  (4 April 1823 – 19 November 1883), anglicised to Charles William Siemens, was a German-British electrical engineer and businessman.

Biography
Siemens was born in the village of Lenthe, today part of Gehrden, near Hanover where his father, Christian Ferdinand Siemens (31 July 1787 – 16 January 1840), a tenant farmer, farmed an estate belonging to the Crown. The Siemens family is an old family of Goslar which has been documented since 1384. His mother was Eleonore Deichmann (1792–8 July 1839), and William, or Carl Wilhelm, was the fourth son of a family of fourteen children.  Of his siblings, Ernst Werner Siemens, the fourth child, became a famous electrician and was associated with William in many of his inventions. He was also the brother of Carl Heinrich von Siemens and a cousin of Alexander Siemens.

On 23 July 1859, Siemens was married at St James's, Paddington, to Anne Gordon—the youngest daughter of Mr Joseph Gordon, Writer to the Signet, Edinburgh, and sister of Mr Lewis Gordon, Professor of Engineering in the University of Glasgow—and became a naturalised British citizen. He used to say that on 19 March of that year he took oath and allegiance to two ladies in one day—to The Queen and to his betrothed.  He was knighted—becoming Sir William—a few months before his death. He died on the evening of Monday 19 November 1883 and was buried one week later in Kensal Green Cemetery, London. A glass window installed in Westminster Abbey in his honour commemorated him. Lady Siemens died in 1902.

The early years
In the autumn of 1838 when William was fifteen years old, he began his studies to become an engineer. He attended a highly respected School of Trade and Commerce, the Gewerbe-Schule Magdeburg. William had a particularly close relationship with his eldest brother; Ernst Werner Siemens had decided to teach William mathematics so that he could learn English at school instead. This programme helped them both and William's knowledge of English proved an incalculable advantage to them both. He went on to pass his examination easily. Less than a year later, their mother died and their father soon afterwards in 1840.

Once William had completed his course at the Magdeburg school he went on to the University of Göttingen where he attended lectures on physical geography and technology, high mathematics, theoretical chemistry and practical chemistry and physics. He was also able for a short time to work with Wilhelm Weber, the renowned scientist and inventor, in his Magnetic Observatory.

William was nearly nineteen when he left university to become an apprentice engineer. He also found time for more artistic pursuits such as taking dancing lessons and even painting a landscape of Nordhausen for the wife of the factory manager. His progress in the engineering factory was so rapid that his two-year apprenticeship was cut down to one.

Due to the education of the younger members of the family becoming a financial worry, on 10 March 1843, Carl Wilhelm Siemens left for London. He was acting as an agent for his brother Werner, and he hoped to earn enough money by selling a patent in England to help support and educate his many brothers and sisters. He felt a keen desire to see England and the journey cost him £1. William had already shown himself to be an enthusiastic businessman, having financed his trip by selling an invention of his brother's, an improvement to the gold and silver plating process, to George Richards Elkington. He was well aware, as he wrote to Werner, that his visit might achieve nothing, but if all went well he intended to remain. This indeed proved to be the case.

Career
Siemens had been trained as a mechanical engineer, and his most important work at this early stage was non-electrical; the greatest achievement of his life, the regenerative furnace. Though in 1847 he published a paper in Liebig's Annalen der Chemie on the 'Mercaptan of Selenium,' his mind was busy with the new ideas upon the nature of heat which were promulgated by Carnot, Clapeyron, Joule, Clausius, Mayer, Thomson, and Rankine. He discarded the older notions of heat as a substance, and accepted it as a form of energy.  Working on this new line of thought, which gave him an advantage over other inventors of his time, he made his first attempt to economise heat, by constructing, in 1847, at the factory of John Hick, of Bolton, an engine of four horse-power, having a condenser provided with regenerators, and using superheated steam.

Two years later he continued his experiments at the works of Messrs. Fox, Henderson, and Co., of Smethwick, near Birmingham, who had taken the matter in hand.  The use of superheated steam was attended with many practical difficulties, and the invention was not entirely successful; nevertheless, the Society of Arts, in 1850, acknowledged the value of the principle, by awarding Siemens a gold medal for his regenerative condenser.

In 1850 he established the London sales office of Siemens & Halske, the engineering company producing telegraphs, which his brother Werner had founded in 1847 at Berlin. He started selling such devices to the wire rope producer R.S. Newall and Company in Dundee, of which his friend (and uncle of his later wife) Lewis Gordon was the co-owner. Newall & Co also outsourced test jobs for cables to Siemens and such enabled the new company to enter the ocean cable-laying business. The branch office became Siemens Brothers in 1858. In the 1850s, the company was involved in building long distance telegraph networks in Russia. In 1855, a company branch headed by another brother, Carl Heinrich von Siemens, opened in St Petersburg, Russia. By 1863, Sir William had his own cable factory built at Charlton, London. In 1867, Siemens completed the monumental Indo-European (Calcutta to London) telegraph line.

In 1859 William Siemens devoted a great part of his time to electrical invention and research; and the number of telegraph apparatus of all sorts – telegraph cables, land lines, and their accessories – which have emanated from the Siemens Telegraph Works (at Charlton, SE London) has been remarkable. In 1872 Sir William Siemens became the first President of the Society of Telegraph Engineers which became the Institution of Electrical Engineers, the forerunner of the Institution of Engineering and Technology 

In 1860 William Siemens constructed a remarkable gas engine (the same year the very first commercial engine was produced by Lenoir). It didn't get beyond the experimental stage, though its principle of operation (described in Siemens British patent 2074 of 1860, and by Siemens in The Theory of the Gas Engine) appears to be similar to the commercially successful Brayton engine of 1872. In the discussion section of The Theory of the Gas Engine Siemens discloses that :
"The engine promised to give very good results, but about the same time he began to give his attention to the production of intense heat in furnaces, and having to make his choice between the two subjects, he selected the furnace and the metallurgic process leading out of it ; and that was why the engine had remained where it was for so long a time."

Siemens was also responsible for the hot tube ignition system used on many of the early gas engines.

In June 1862 he was elected a Fellow of the Royal Society and in 1871 delivered their Bakerian Lecture.

As a member of the circumnavigation committee preparing the oceanographic expedition of HMS Challenger, Siemens was commissioned in 1871 to develop an electric thermometer to measure the temperature of the ocean at different depths.

He was elected as a member to the American Philosophical Society in 1877.

The regenerative furnace is the greatest single invention of Charles William Siemens, using a process known as the Siemens-Martin process. The electric pyrometer, which is perhaps the most elegant and original of all William Siemens's inventions, is also the link which connects his electrical with his metallurgical researches. Siemens pursued two major themes in his inventive efforts, one based upon the science of heat, the other based upon the science of electricity; and the electric thermometer was, as it were, a delicate cross-coupling which connected both.

In 1874 he had a special cable ship built, according to his design, for Siemens Brothers, the CS Faraday. In 1881, a Siemens AC Alternator driven by a watermill was used to power the world's first electric street lighting in the town of Godalming, United Kingdom.

See also
Siemens cycle
Turboexpander

References

Sources
Shaping the Future. The Siemens Entrepreneurs 1847–2018. Ed. Siemens Historical Institute, Hamburg 2018, .
William Pole, Life of William Siemens, (London, 1888), p. 471; Facsimile reprint Siemens Ltd. 1986, 
 Richard Hennig, Buch der berühmten Ingenieure (A book on famous engineers), (Leipzig, 1911)
 
 
 Sir William Siemens – A Man of Vision, A collection of articles by various authors published by Siemens plc in 1993, contains substantial material on the history of Siemens in the UK

External links

Profile from the Siemens company
Past IEE Presidents
 Portrait of Carl Wilhelm Siemens from the Lick Observatory Records Digital Archive, UC Santa Cruz Library's Digital Collections

1823 births
1883 deaths
19th-century German engineers
Bessemer Gold Medal
British electrical engineers
British inventors
German industrialists
British technology chief executives
Burials at Kensal Green Cemetery
Fellows of the Royal Society
German chief executives
German electrical engineers
German emigrants to the United Kingdom
19th-century German inventors
Knights Bachelor
Naturalised citizens of the United Kingdom
People associated with the internal combustion engine
People from Gehrden
People from the Kingdom of Hanover
People of the Industrial Revolution
Presidents of the Smeatonian Society of Civil Engineers
Wilhelm
Engineers from Lower Saxony